Arnoia may also refer to:

 A Arnoia, a municipality in the province of Ourense in the Galicia region of north-west Spain
 Arnoia, a tributary river of the río Miño in Galicia, northwest Spain
  Castle of Arnóia, a medieval castle in civil parish of Arnóia, in Portugal